Brigadier Bernard Edward Fergusson, Baron Ballantrae,  (6 May 1911 – 28 November 1980) was a British Army officer and military historian. He became the last British-born governor-general of New Zealand.

Early life and family
Fergusson was the third son and fourth child of Sir Charles Fergusson, 7th Baronet, and his wife Lady Alice Mary Boyle, a daughter of David Boyle, 7th Earl of Glasgow. His older brother was Sir James Fergusson, 8th Baronet, of Kilkerran. Both of his grandfathers had previously served as governors of New Zealand and his father had served as governor-general.

On 22 November 1950 Fergusson married Laura Margaret Grenfell (14 April 1920−1979), daughter of Arthur Morton Grenfell and sister of Dame Frances Campbell-Preston. Laura was accidentally killed in 1979 when gales blew a tree onto the car in which she was travelling. She and Bernard had one child, George (b. 30 September 1955), who served as the British high commissioner to New Zealand from 2006 to 2010 and governor of Bermuda from 2012.

Military career, 1931–1946
Fergusson was educated at Eton College and the Royal Military College, Sandhurst. From the latter, he was commissioned as a second lieutenant into the Black Watch on 27 August 1931. He was promoted to lieutenant on 27 August 1934. He served with the 2nd Battalion of his regiment in the British Mandate of Palestine during the Arab revolt and later became aide-de-camp (ADC) to Major General Archibald Wavell, then General Officer Commanding of the 2nd Infantry Division in England, on 11 March 1937. In October 1937, he was on secondment to the Green Howards. Fergusson was promoted to captain on 27 August 1939, only a few days before the outbreak of the Second World War.

In 1940, Fergusson was serving as a brigade major for the 46th Infantry Brigade before becoming a general staff officer in the Middle East. In October 1943 he was promoted to acting brigadier and given command of the 16th Infantry Brigade, which was converted into a Chindit formation for operations in the deep jungles of Burma miles behind Japanese lines. He commanded this brigade throughout the Chindit operations of 1944 before becoming Director of Combined Operations from 1945 to 1946. He ended the war as a major (war-substantive lieutenant-colonel).

After the war, Fergusson held various positions, including command of the 1st Battalion, Black Watch.

Service in Palestine, 1946–1947
In 1946, having failed to be elected to Parliament, Fergusson returned to Palestine during the Palestine Emergency as a brigadier and joined the Palestine Police Force. At first he commanded the "Police Mobile Force", a unit of 2,000 armed PPF personnel trained as light infantry and used as a quick reaction force against Zionist paramilitary groups. By the end of 1946 the unit was disbanded, by the order of the PPF commandant, Col. William Nicol Gray. Fergusson took command of a police school that was to be created in Jenin, but soon he was appointed by Gray as "special assistant to the commandant of police".

Fergusson suggested to Gray, who was himself a former Royal Marine, that special units be formed to fight against Zionist paramilitaries. These units would include former soldiers who had served in the British special forces during the war. Gray accepted the idea and ordered the creation of two undercover police units, whose members were selected from serving PPF policemen and former special forces soldiers. One unit would operate in Haifa and the north, while the second unit would operate in the Jerusalem area. War hero Roy Farran was appointed as the commander of the second team.

On 6 May 1947, Farran's police unit arrested 16-year-old Alexander Rubowitz, who was putting up posters in Jerusalem for a Zionist paramilitary organisation, Lehi. Rubowitz was taken by Farran's team, and tortured to force him to surrender his friend's names. The boy did not survive the torture. His body was dumped and never found. Suspicions of Farran's involvement were first raised after a grey trilby hat bearing an indistinct name compatible with his, was found near the street corner where Rubowitz was seen being pushed into a car. In 2004 British secret documents were revealed that included a statement by Fergusson, from the time of the event, to the effect that Farran confessed to Fergusson of the murder. Fergusson then reported the incident to Gray.

Gray was reluctant to take action against Farran, believing he could use some information produced from Rubowitz by Farran to defeat the Lehi in Jerusalem. Gray believed that arresting Farran would ruin these efforts. While Gray was on leave in England, the acting CID commandant, Arthur Giles, ordered an investigation into Farran's actions. Farran escaped to Syria to avoid arrest, but was convinced by Fergusson to return voluntarily. He then escaped from custody and went to Jordan before again returning of his own accord. He was brought to trial in a British military court in Jerusalem.

At Farran's trial, Fergusson refused to testify on grounds that he might incriminate himself. The Palestine government announced that no action would be taken against Fergusson. The trial ended with Farran's acquittal. Fergusson was relieved of his duties in Palestine and returned to Britain.

Military career, 1951–1958
Fergusson was brevetted to lieutenant colonel on 1 July 1951, promoted to lieutenant colonel on 5 March 1952, and promoted to colonel on 6 May 1952. He retired on 13 December 1958 with the honorary rank of brigadier.

Suez Crisis

Impressed by Fergusson's role in the Malayan Emergency, Gerald Templer placed him in charge of psychological warfare operations during the Suez Crisis, a joint invasion of Egypt by the British, French and Israelis to take control of the Suez Canal. Despite drafting an extensive campaign of psychological warfare for use during the crisis, the actual operations when the Royal Air Force (RAF) commenced aerial campaigns against Egyptian targets were very different and ultimately made little impact on Egyptian morale or public opinion. Psychological warfare radio broadcasts made under Fergusson's direction and directed at Egypt stated that President Gamal Abdel Nasser was under the influence of Zionism and urged Egyptians to attack Israel, which elicited diplomatic protests from future Israeli Prime Minister Golda Meir.

Governor-General of New Zealand

In 1962, Fergusson was appointed governor-general of New Zealand, serving until 1967.

Fergusson was created a life peer on 10 July 1972 as Baron Ballantrae, of Auchairne in the County of Ayrshire and The Bay of Islands in New Zealand.

Lord Ballantrae served as chancellor of the University of St Andrews from 1973 until his death in 1980.

Memorial scholarship
The Bernard Fergusson Memorial Scholarship was established in 1982 by the late Maori Queen, Dame Te Atairangikaahu, from a fund raised on her behalf in memory of Fergusson, as he was a particular friend of the Tainui people.

The purpose of the award is to assist a member of the Tainui Tribal Confederation resident in the Tainui Maori Trust Board area to enrol as an undergraduate student in the University of Waikato, who but for the award, might otherwise not be able to attend the university.

Due to his relationship with Tainui, a Ngāruawāhia Primary School was named after him in 1966. Over the years, many students from the school would go on to receive the memorial scholarship.

Honours and awards

Arms

Bibliography
Eton Portrait (1937) London: John Miles Ltd.
Beyond the Chindwin (1945) London: Collins  also Barnsley: Pen & Sword Military (2009) 
Lowland Soldier (1945) London: Collins (verse)
The Wild Green Earth (1946) London: Collins
The Black Watch and the King's Enemies (1950) London: Collins also Derby: Pilgrim Press (1974) 
Rupert of the Rhine (1952) London: Collins
The Rare Adventure (1954) London: Collins
The Business of War: The War Narrative of Major-General Sir John Kennedy (1957) (editor) London: Hutchinson
The Watery Maze: The Story of Combined Operations (1961) London: Collins
Wavell: Portrait of a Soldier (1961) London: Collins
Return to Burma (1962) London: Collins
The Trumpet in the Hall 1930–1958 (1970) London: Collins 
Captain John Niven (1972) London: Collins 
Hubble-Bubble (1978) London: Collins  (light verse)
Travel Warrant (1979) London: Collins

References

External links
Official biography
Collected obituaries
Publications list
Generals of World War II

1911 births
1980 deaths
Black Watch officers
British Army brigadiers of World War II
Bernard
Graduates of the Royal Military College, Sandhurst
Governors-General of New Zealand
Life peers
Knights Grand Cross of the Order of St Michael and St George
Knights of the Thistle
Knights Grand Cross of the Royal Victorian Order
Officers of the Order of the British Empire
Companions of the Distinguished Service Order
Chancellors of the University of St Andrews
Younger sons of baronets
Lords High Commissioner to the General Assembly of the Church of Scotland
British military personnel of the Palestine Emergency
Children of national leaders
British military personnel of the 1936–1939 Arab revolt in Palestine
People from Maybole
People of the British Council
Military personnel from London
Life peers created by Elizabeth II